Chrysobrycon is a genus of characins endemic to South America.

Species
There are currently 5 recognized species in this genus:
 Chrysobrycon eliasi Vanegas-Ríos, Azpelicueta & H. Ortega, 2011 
 Chrysobrycon guahibo Vanegas-Ríos, Urbano-Bonilla & Azpelicueta, 2015 
 Chrysobrycon hesperus (J. E. Böhlke, 1958)
 Chrysobrycon myersi (S. H. Weitzman & Thomerson, 1970)
 Chrysobrycon yoliae Vanegas-Ríos, Azpelicueta & H. Ortega, 2014

References

Characidae
Fish of South America
Fish of Colombia
Fish of Peru